Jack Rapke is an American film producer who has produced such films as the 2000 Robert Zemeckis film Cast Away.

Biography
Upon his graduation from New York University Film School in 1974, Jack Rapke moved to Los Angeles to embark on a career in the entertainment industry. His first stop was the mailroom of the William Morris Agency in 1975. Four years later, Rapke joined Creative Artists Agency (CAA), where he rose, over the course of the next seventeen years, to become one of the most successful agents in Hollywood.

During a seven-year tenure as co-chairman of CAA's motion picture department, Rapke cultivated a high-profile client list that included Ridley Scott, Michael Mann, Harold Ramis, Michael Bay, Terry Gilliam, Bob Gale, Bo Goldman, Steve Kloves, Howard Franklin, Scott Frank, Robert Kamen, John Hughes, Joel Schumacher, Marty Brest, Chris Columbus, Ezra Sacks, and Ron Howard. Instrumental in building production companies around his clients, it was only a matter of time before he decided to build one of his own with client Robert Zemeckis.

In 1998, Rapke departed CAA to form ImageMovers with Zemeckis. Primarily focused on theatrical motion pictures, the company's first feature was the critically acclaimed “Cast Away,” directed by Zemeckis and starring Tom Hanks. Rapke went on to produce numerous hits including  “What Lies Beneath” starring Harrison Ford and Michelle Pfeiffer, the Ridley Scott-directed “Matchstick Men” starring Nicolas Cage, “The Prize Winner of Defiance, Ohio” starring Julianne Moore and Woody Harrelson, and “Last Holiday” starring Queen Latifah.

Rapke Executive Produced “The Polar Express” starring Tom Hanks for Warner Bros., which blazed a new trail for modern 3D filmmaking. He produced the Oscar-nominated “Monster House,” for Sony Pictures, “Beowulf,” starring Anthony Hopkins and Angelina Jolie for Paramount and “A Christmas Carol,” for The Walt Disney Studios, starring Jim Carrey and Colin Firth. He was also Executive Producer on the film “Real Steel,” starring Hugh Jackman, directed by Shawn Levy for DreamWorks.

Rapke Produced “Flight,” for Paramount Pictures starring Denzel Washington, which was nominated for two Academy Awards. He also Produced “The Walk,” which starred Joseph Gordon-Levitt for Sony Pictures and he Executive Produced the feature film “Allied,” which starred Brad Pitt, for Paramount Pictures.

Rapke served as Producer on “Welcome to Marwen” for Universal Pictures which starred Steve Carell and Produced “The Witches” for Warner Bros. Studios which starred Anne Hathaway and Octavia Spencer and he served as Producer on the upcoming “Finch” for DreamWorks/Universal starring Tom Hanks.  He is also the producer on “Pinocchio” for the Disney Studios.

For Television, Rapke was Executive Producer for the three seasons of “The Borgias” starring Jeremy Irons for Showtime and  Executive Producer on the documentary series “Medal of Honor,” for Netflix. He served as Executive Producer on “Blue Book” for the History Channel and has Executive Produced all three seasons of “Manifest” for NBC TV and Warner Bros. Studios.

Filmography

Producer
 What Lies Beneath (2000)
 Cast Away (2000)
 Matchstick Men (2003)
 The Prize Winner of Defiance, Ohio (2005)
 Last Holiday (2006)
 Monster House (2006)
 Beowulf (2007)
 A Christmas Carol (2009)
 Mars Needs Moms (2011)
 Flight (2012)
 The Walk (2015)
 Welcome to Marwen (2018)
 The Witches (2020)
 Finch (2021)

Executive producer

References

External links

Living people
American Jews
American film producers
Year of birth missing (living people)